Kaptai Cantonment is a cantonment located at Kaptai in Rangamati District. A navy base and the headquarters of 65th infantry brigade, which is under 24th Infantry Division of Bangladesh Army, are located in Kaptai. Its prime role is to guard the Kaptai Dam.

See also 
 Bandarban Cantonment
 Khagrachari Cantonment
 Rangamati Cantonment

References 

Cantonments of Bangladesh
Chittagong